Kusunoki (written:  or , lit. "camphor tree") is a Japanese surname. Notable people with the surname include:

, Japanese manga artist
, Japanese samurai
, Japanese samurai
, Japanese samurai
, Japanese samurai
, Japanese samurai
, Japanese manga artist
, Japanese sport shooter
, Japanese voice actor and actor
, Japanese voice actress
, Japanese businessman

See also
 George Kusunoki Miller, better known as Joji, Japanese singer-songwriter, record producer, writer, Internet personality, YouTuber and comedian
 Kusunoki, Yamaguchi, a former town in Asa District, Yamaguchi Prefecture, Japan
 Kusunoki Point, a headland on the Biscoe Islands, Antarctica
 , several ships 
 Kusu (disambiguation)

Japanese-language surnames